The Guatemala River is a river of San Sebastián, Puerto Rico.

Gallery
River as seen from the bridge in Guatemala barrio:

See also
List of rivers of Puerto Rico

References

External links
 USGS Hydrologic Unit Map – Caribbean Region (1974)
Rios de Puerto Rico

Rivers of Puerto Rico